Greek-Latvian relations are the bilateral relations between Greece and Latvia. Both countries are full members of the Organization for Security and Co-operation in Europe, of NATO and the European Union. The Latvian embassy in Athens was established in 1998. Latvia also has two honorary consulates in Piraeus and in Thessaloniki. The Greek embassy in Riga was opened in January 2005.

History
Greece recognized the State of Latvia on May 23, 1922. Relations between the two countries were disrupted by World War II, which saw Latvia occupied briefly by Germany and then for a longer period by the Soviets. Latvia's return to independence was recognized by Greece on August 27, 1991; followed by the restoration of diplomatic relations on September 2, 1991. Greece had never officially recognized the annexation of the Baltic states by the former Soviet Union.

Bilateral visits

Several ministerial and state visits have occurred since 1997:
27 August 1997 to 31 August 1997; Valdis Birkavs, the Latvian Minister of Foreign Affairs visited Greece.
14 October 1997 to 15 October 1997; George Papandreou, the Alternate Minister of Foreign Affairs visited Latvia.
16 March 1999 to 20 March 1999; Guntis Ulmanis, the President of Latvia visited Greece.
19 October 1999; Christos Rokofyllos, the Alternate Minister of Foreign Affairs visited Latvia.
8 October 2000 to 11 October 2000; President Constantinos Stephanopoulos to Latvia.Konstantinos Stephanopoulos, the President of Greece visited Latvia. Greece agreed to support Latvia's bid to join NATO and the European Union.
12 May 2001 to 22 May 2001; Vaira Vike-Freiberga, the President of Latvia meets with Konstantinos Stephanopoulos, the President of Greece in the summit titled "Towards a New Economy: the Revolution of Information" in Athens. They discuss Latvia's entry into the European Union and NATO.
27 March 2002 to 29 March 2002; Vaira Vīķe-Freiberga, the President of Latvia visited Greece and discussed the relations between the countries.
1 July 2002; Visit to Latvia by the Alternate Minister of Foreign Affairs of Greece, Anastasios Giannitsis.
 May 2003; Kostas Simitis, the Prime Minister of Greece visited Latvia.
 August 2004; Vaira Vīķe-Freiberga, the President of Latvia visited Greece during the 2004 Summer Olympics.

Bilateral agreements

Several bilateral agreements are in place:
 1998 International Carriage of Passengers and Goods by Road
 1998 Protection and mutual promotion of investments
 1999 Agreement on Mutual Abolition of Visa Requirements
 2000 Economic and technological cooperation
 2001 Cooperation in the Fields of Culture, Education and Science
 2002 Avoidance of double taxation (not yet in force)

Trade
Greece's exports to Latvia in 2006 included: chemicals (19.2% of total exports), processed foods (18.7%), metals (18.7%), clothing (13.5%), and raw fruit and vegetables (8.2%). Greece imports from Latvia in 2006 included: timber (42% of total imports), minerals (17.3%), clothing (13.8%). Greece has a trade surplus with Latvia.

Diplomacy

Republic of Greece
Riga (Embassy) 

Republic of Latvia
Athens (Embassy)

See also
Foreign relations of Greece
Foreign relations of Latvia

References

External links
Greek Ministry of Foreign Affairs about the relation with Latvia
 Latvian Ministry of Foreign Affairs: list of bilateral treaties with Greece
 Latvian Ministry of Foreign Affairs: directions of Latvian representations in Greece 
 Latvian honorary consulate in Thessaloniki

 
Latvia
Greece